John Sheldwich II (died c. 1455), of Canterbury, Kent, was an English politician and lawyer.

Family
Sheldwich was the son of the earlier MP for Canterbury, John Sheldwich. Sheldwich married, before January 1420, a woman named Isabel. They had one son.

Career
Sheldwich was a Member of Parliament for Canterbury, Kent in February 1413, April 1414, November 1414, 1415, March 1416, 1417, 1419, May 1421, 1423, 1427, 1429, 1431, 1433 and 1439.

References

14th-century births
Year of birth missing
1455 deaths
People from Canterbury
English MPs February 1413
English MPs April 1414
English MPs November 1414
English MPs 1415
English MPs March 1416
English MPs 1417
English MPs 1419
English MPs May 1421
English MPs 1423
English MPs 1427
English MPs 1429
English MPs 1431
English MPs 1433
English MPs 1439